Megalochlamys is a genus of flowering plants belonging to the family Acanthaceae.

Its native range is Eritrea to Southern Africa, and the Arabian Peninsula.

Species
Species:

Megalochlamys hamata 
Megalochlamys kenyensis 
Megalochlamys linifolia 
Megalochlamys marlothii 
Megalochlamys ogadenensis 
Megalochlamys revoluta 
Megalochlamys tanaensis 
Megalochlamys tanzaniensis 
Megalochlamys trinervia 
Megalochlamys violacea

References

Acanthaceae
Acanthaceae genera